Live at Montreux 1982 & 1985 is the fourth live album of American blues musician Stevie Ray Vaughan and his band Double Trouble, recorded at the Montreux Jazz Festival on July 17, 1982 (Disc 1) and July 15, 1985 (Disc 2), and released November 20, 2001 on Epic Records. Neither are complete concerts.

Track listing 
Disc One - July 17, 1982
 "Hide Away" (Freddie King) - 3:19
 "Rude Mood" (Stevie Ray Vaughan) - 4:54
 "Pride and Joy" (Vaughan) - 4:01
 "Texas Flood" (Larry Davis, Joseph Wade Scott) – 10:27
 "Love Struck Baby" (Vaughan) – 2:53
 "Dirty Pool" (Doyle Bramhall, Vaughan) – 8:17
 "Give Me Back My Wig" (Theodore Taylor) - 3:30
 "Collins Shuffle" (Albert Collins) - 4:51

Disc Two - July 15, 1985
 "Scuttle Buttin'" (Vaughan) - 3:02
 "Say What!" (Vaughan) - 4:45
 "Ain't Gone n' Give Up on Love" (Vaughan) - 6:24
 "Pride and Joy" (Vaughan) - 5:10
 "Mary Had a Little Lamb" (Buddy Guy) - 4:27
 "Tin Pan Alley (aka Roughest Place in Town) (with Johnny Copeland)" (Robert Geddins) - 13:18
 "Voodoo Chile (Slight Return)" (Jimi Hendrix) - 10:51
 "Texas Flood" (Larry Davis, Joseph Wade Scott) - 7:37
 "Life Without You" (Vaughan) - 9:03
 "Gone Home" (Eddie Harris) - 3:53
 "Couldn't Stand the Weather" (Vaughan) - 7:29

Background
In early 1982, Double Trouble played a show at the Continental Club in Austin, TX. Impressed by the show, legendary producer Jerry Wexler recommended the band play the Montreux Jazz Festival in Switzerland. Booked to play at Montreux International Festival XVI on July 17, 1982, the band's appearance marked the first time that an unsigned act would appear at the prestigious event. Booked on an acoustic night, Double Trouble's performance was met by boos. Vaughan's high volume electric blues was not popular with the European crowd, who preferred a quieter, folk blues style.

However, the first Montreux trip was not a bust. In a last-ditch effort to save the trip, the band's manager, Chelsey Millikin, booked the band to play the casino's after hours bar for two nights running. On the first night, Vaughan was approached by David Bowie, who had seen the Montreux performance, and was interested in having Vaughan play on one of his albums. This would lead to Vaughan's guitar work on Bowie's album, Let's Dance. On the second night, Millikin introduced Vaughan to Jackson Browne, who was impressed by the band's sound. Browne and his band joined Double Trouble on stage, where they jammed until seven the next morning. Browne was so moved by Double Trouble's music that he offered them use of his private recording studio, free of charge. Vaughan and Double Trouble would take Browne up on his offer, and the ensuing recordings would become Texas Flood, which would bring the band into the national spotlight.

Stevie Ray Vaughan and Double Trouble returned to the Montreux Jazz Festival in 1985 as headliners, and were well received by the audience.

DVD release
A DVD of the Montreux performances was released on September 14, 2004. The DVD version includes the same set-lists as the album, with two extra Johnny Copeland featured songs ("Cold Shot" and "Look at Little Sister") on the 1985 disc. The 1982 disc includes a documentary of the Montreux performances entitled Success in Disguise.

Personnel

Musicians
 Stevie Ray Vaughan - guitar and vocals
 Chris Layton - drums
 Tommy Shannon - bass
 Reese Wynans - organ
 Johnny Copeland - guitar and vocals

Production
 Michael B Borofsky - DVD Producer
 Vic Anesini - Mastering
 Chris Theis - Mixing
 Andy Manganello - Mixing
 Steve Berkowitz - Legacy A&R
 John Jackson - Project Direction
 Patti Matheny - A&R Coordination
 Darren Salmieri - A&R Coordination
 Josh Cheuse - Art Direction
 Angela Skouras - Design
 Breanda McManus - Design Assistance
 Noel Wiggins - Design Assistance
 Darryl Pitt - Cover Photography & Liner Photography
 Don Opperman - Liner Photography
 John Christiana - Packaging Manager

Charts
Album - Billboard (North America)

Notes

References

External links
Music video of Stevie Ray Vaughan's performance of "Tin Pan Alley" at the Montreux Jazz Festival, 1985.

Stevie Ray Vaughan live albums
2001 live albums
Epic Records live albums
Albums recorded at the Montreux Jazz Festival
Live blues albums